Elinor Field (born Eleanor Field; January 4, 1902 – February 24, 1998) was an American film actress who was one of Mack Sennett's Sennett Bathing Beauties. She also starred in the 15-episode serial The Jungle Goddess (1922).

Biography
Elinor Field was born on January 4, 1902, in Plymouth, Pennsylvania, USA, as Eleanor Field. She began acting straight out of high school. Although she appeared in more than thirty films Field never became a major star. She died on February 24, 1998, in Chestertown, Maryland at the age of 96.

Selected filmography

The Pullman Bride (1917) as Mack Sennett a Sennett Bathing Beauties (uncredited) 
How to be Happy Though Married (1919)
The Blue Moon (1920)
 The Kentucky Colonel (1920)
Once to Every Woman (1920) as Virginia Meredith
Hearts and Masks (1921)
 Little Eva Ascends (1922)
 The Purple Riders (1922)
The Leather Pushers (1922) 
The Jungle Goddess (1922), a 15-episode serial
Don Quickshot of the Rio Grande (1923), starring role
Blinky (1923) as Priscilla Islip
Single Handed (1923) as Ruth Randolph
 The Red Warning (1923) as Louise Ainslee

References

External links

 

1902 births
1998 deaths
American film actresses
20th-century American actresses
20th-century American people